Oleksandr Petrovich Prevar (born 28 June 1990) is a Ukrainian cyclist, who currently rides for UCI Continental team .

Major results

2011
 4th Overall Tour of Szeklerland
 8th Golan II
 9th Overall Grand Prix of Adygeya
2012
 8th Overall Carpathia Couriers Paths
2014
 3rd Puchar Uzdrowisk Karpackich
 7th Overall Tour of Szeklerland
2015
 5th GP Slovakia
 7th GP Hungary
 10th Korona Kocich Gór
2016
 1st Odessa Grand Prix
 3rd Time trial, National Road Championships
 8th GP Polski
 9th Overall CCC Tour - Grody Piastowskie
2017
 1st Horizon Park Classic
 3rd Time trial, National Road Championships
 4th Overall Tour of Ukraine
1st Stage 2 (TTT)
 6th Memoriał Romana Siemińskiego
 9th Horizon Park Race for Peace
 10th Tour de Ribas
 10th Memoriał Andrzeja Trochanowskiego
2018
 2nd Overall Tour of Szeklerland
1st Mountains classification
1st Stage 2
 7th Overall Tour de Hongrie
2019
 1st Mountains classification Tour of Black Sea
 4th Overall Tour of Mevlana
 9th Horizon Park Race for Peace

References

External links

1990 births
Living people
Ukrainian male cyclists
European Games competitors for Ukraine
Cyclists at the 2019 European Games
Sportspeople from Vinnytsia Oblast
21st-century Ukrainian people